The following lists events that happened during 1858 in South Africa.

Incumbents
 Governor of the Cape of Good Hope and High Commissioner for Southern Africa: Sir George Grey.
 Lieutenant-governor of the Colony of Natal: John Scott.
 State President of the Orange Free State: Jacobus Nicolaas Boshoff.
 President of the Executive Council of the South African Republic: Marthinus Wessel Pretorius.

Events
March
 19 – Senekal's War breaks out between the Orange Free State and the Basotho tribe.

Births

Deaths

References

South Africa
Years in South Africa
History of South Africa